Little Llwygy Farmhouse, Cwmyoy, Monmouthshire, Wales, is a farmhouse of two building dates, the earlier of the 15th century, the latter of the 17th. The farmhouse is a Grade II* listed building.

History
The origin of the farmhouse is late-medieval, possibly the early 15th century. In their three-volume history, Monmouthshire Houses, Sir Cyril Fox and Lord Raglan described it as "the only example of a mediaeval one-roomed house open to the roof in Monmouthshire". The building was extended in the 17th century, possibly around 1610, by the construction of a larger, two-storey, block. Coflein suggests that the original wing was demoted to the status of a service wing at this time. The farmhouse was listed Grade II* in 1956. In 2012, the house was on the market for £425,000.

Architecture and description
John Newman, in his Gwent/Monmouthshire volume of the Pevsner Buildings of Wales series, describes Little Llwygy’s setting; “high up and lonely on the hillside”. The earlier block consists of a single room, constructed in stone. It contains a "splendid" fireplace. This structure is now used for storage. The 16th century extension, also in Old Red Sandstone, is two-storeyed with an attic.

Notes

References

External links
 RCAHMW/Coflein photographic record of the house

Grade II* listed buildings in Monmouthshire
Farmhouses in Wales
Houses in Monmouthshire
Grade II* listed houses in Wales